The Massachusetts General Laws is a codification of many of the statutes of the Commonwealth of Massachusetts.  The Commonwealth's laws are promulgated by an elected bicameral ("two-chamber") legislative body, the Massachusetts General Court.  The resulting laws—both Session Laws and General Laws—together make up the statutory law of the Commonwealth.

Each bill that becomes law is given a chapter number, assigned sequentially in the chronological order of its adoption – these are the Session Laws. The official publication of Session Laws for any given year is called the Acts and Resolves of Massachusetts, and is compiled and published annually by the Secretary of the Commonwealth. The vast majority of Session Laws are Acts. A Resolve is most typically used to establish a special commission to investigate a certain issue.

General Laws are Session Laws (or sections of Session Laws) that are permanent in nature and of general application. They are codified according to subject matter into a multi-volume publication entitled the General Laws of Massachusetts. The General Court amends the General Laws by enacting Session Laws which may effect modifications and additions to the General Laws.

Not all Session Laws, which apply equally to codified law, are entered into the General Laws. Session Laws that are not codified into the General Laws are called Special Acts, and might include matters affecting an individual or a particular city or town.

In legal citations, Massachusetts General Laws are abbreviated as M.G.L. or G.L.  Provisions in the General Laws are identified by chapter and section, e.g., .  Chapters are grouped topically by part and title.

The parts of the General Laws are as follows:

{| class="wikitable"
|-
! Part !! Description !! Chapters
|-
| I || Administration of Government || 1–182
|-
| II || Real and Personal Property and Domestic Relations || 183–210
|-
| III|| Courts, Judicial Officers, and Proceedings in Civil Cases || 211–262
|-
| IV || Crimes, Punishments, and Proceedings in Criminal Cases || 263–280
|-
| V || The General Laws and Express Repeal of Certain Acts and Resolves   || 281–282   
|-
|}

The unannotated official version of the General Laws is published every two years.  Two widely used annotated collections are Massachusetts General Laws Annotated (M.G.L.A.) from West Publishing, and Annotated Laws of Massachusetts (A.L.M.) published by LexisNexis. Both are available as bound collections and by subscription online.

The General Laws replaced the General Statutes, which are abbreviated as G.S. when cited in lists of local-option statutes accepted by cities and towns.

The Massachusetts Constitution expressly grants to the Massachusetts Supreme Judicial Court the power to review and interpret these laws.

See also 
 Code of Massachusetts Regulations
 Law of Massachusetts
 List of U.S. state statutory codes

References

External links
 The General Laws of Massachusetts - unofficial copy on the Massachusetts legislature website
 The General Laws of Massachusetts - a third-party, unofficial, searchable database on Massachusetts General Laws
 Massachusetts General Laws from FindLaw
 Massachusetts Legislative Procedure - an overview of legislative procedure in Massachusetts
 Massachusetts Legislative History - an overview of legislative history in Massachusetts
 Acts and Resolves (Session Laws), 1996 and later - Massachusetts legislature website
 Acts and Resolves (Session Laws), prior to 1996 - Massachusetts State Library archives
 Socratek Massachusetts Online Law Reference

Massachusetts General Court
Massachusetts statutes
Massachusetts